Stadio Olimpico del Ghiaccio was built between 1952 and 1954, primarily as an open air Figure skating arena in Cortina d'Ampezzo, Italy, to hold between seven and eight thousand spectators, with the possibility of making temporary arrangements to accommodate twelve to fifteen thousand for the period of the Olympics. The venue was inaugurated on 26 October 1955. During the 1956 Winter Olympics, the arena held the opening and closing ceremonies, the figure skating events and select ice hockey games. Sometime after 1981, a roof was added to the structure. The stadium will host curling in the 2026 Winter Olympics and it will also host wheelchair curling in the 2026 Winter Paralympics.

In popular culture
The stadium is also shown in the 1981 James Bond movie For Your Eyes Only, where Bond (played by Roger Moore) met with the villainous Aris Kristatos (Julian Glover), where Kristatos tries to trick Bond into pursuing and killing his rival Milos Columbo (Topol).

References

External links

1956 Winter Olympics official report. (PDF) pages 121 to 130. 
Cortina Sports Venues 

Indoor arenas in Italy
Indoor ice hockey venues in Italy
Venues of the 1956 Winter Olympics
Venues of the 2026 Winter Olympics
Olympic figure skating venues
Olympic ice hockey venues
Olympic stadiums
Sport in Cortina d'Ampezzo
Sports venues completed in 1955
1955 establishments in Italy